Lamoria idiolepida is a species of snout moth in the genus Lamoria. It was described by Turner in 1922. It is found in Australia, including Queensland.

References

Moths described in 1922
Tirathabini